Ignacio de Loyola is a 2016 Philippine historical biographical religious drama film directed by Paolo Dy in his directorial debut. It is based on the memoirs of Ignatius of Loyola, founder of the Jesuit order who was canonized as a saint in the Catholic Church. The film stars Andreas Muñoz, a Spanish actor who portrays the titular character in the film.

Cast

Production

The English-language film was helmed by Filipino director Paolo Dy and was produced by the media arm of the Society of Jesus in the Philippines, Jesuit Communications. The musical score was written by Filipino composer Ryan Cayabyab.

The film was shot primarily in Spain, particularly in Navarra and the Basque Country, over twenty days, with a ten-hour cap per day. Post-production, including the film's special effects, was done in the Philippines. Dy said that the most challenging part in shooting the film was the battle scene, for which the production team had to bring in stuntmen from the Canary Islands.

It was around 2012 that the Jesuit Communications Foundation contacted director Paolo Dy about making the film. Before shooting, the director's wife Cathy Azanza-Dy sought the aid of her friends from the Philippine theater industry in developing the script. Luna Inocian read the script and provided comments, while others including Jenny Jamora, Topper Fabregas, and Steve Cadd did a table reading in Manila. They reviewed each scene's good points and identified those elements that could be scrapped. They also improved each character's arc. Dy and his wife honed each character's motivation and relationships, and brought the film's focus upon the humanity of Ignatius of Loyola, creating a protagonist with whom the audience could identify. The film adopts elements from traditional theater. The film's costumes were conceived to materially represent each of the character's personalities and are not necessarily historically accurate. Costume designer Juvan Bermil designed the approximately four hundred period costumes. The Spanish cast comprises actors and actresses also with a background in theater.

Release
The film was screened at the Vatican Film Library in the Vatican City on June 14, 2016, becoming the first Philippine film to be screened in the city-state. The Philippine premiere was held at The Theater at Solaire Resort and Casino, Paranaque City on July 23, 2016. The premiere was accompanied by a live orchestra conducted by Gerard Salonga. The film then began its commercial run in Philippine cinemas on July 27, 2016.

Ignacio de Loyola is also planned to be screened in Jesuit communities and universities across the world.

The film was screened in the United States in select cinemas on August 26, 2016.

Possible sequel
If reception to the film is satisfactory, a sequel to the film will be produced, this time on Francis Xavier, a friend of Ignatius of Loyola and co-founder of the Society of Jesus.

References

External links

2016 biographical drama films
2010s historical drama films
Films shot in Spain
Films set in the 16th century
Ignatian spirituality
Philippine biographical films
Biographical films about religious leaders
2016 directorial debut films
Cultural depictions of Ignatius of Loyola
2016 drama films
2010s English-language films